Petra Kvitová was the defending champion but failed to qualify this year.

Julia Görges won the title, defeating CoCo Vandeweghe in the final, 7–5, 6–1.

Players

Alternates

Draw

Finals

Azalea group

Bougainvillea group

Camellia group

Rose group

References

External links
Official Website 
 Singles Draw

WTA Elite Trophy
WTA Elite Trophy
2017 in Chinese tennis